Figueroa Point is an ice-free point at the northeast extremity of Greenwich Island in the South Shetland Islands, Antarctica forming the southeast side of the entrance to Galápagos Cove. The area was visited by early 19th century sealers.

The point is named after First Lieutenant Emiliano Figueroa González, navigation officer aboard the transport ship Angamos during the 1950-51 Chilean Antarctic Expedition, and the rocks are named respectively after Sargeant Dovizio, member of the 1948-49 Chilean Antarctic Expedition; Second Lieutenant Mario Ibar, in charge of the marines onboard of the frigate Iquique during the 1946-47 Chilean Antarctic Expedition; Captain Federico Bonert, second in command of the transport ship Angamos during the 1950-51 Chilean Antarctic Expedition; and Sergeant Rosales, coppersmith in the frigate Iquique during the 1947 Chilean Antarctic Expedition.

Location

See also 
 Composite Antarctic Gazetteer
 List of Antarctic islands south of 60° S
 SCAR
 Territorial claims in Antarctica

Maps
 L.L. Ivanov et al. Antarctica: Livingston Island and Greenwich Island, South Shetland Islands. Scale 1:100000 topographic map. Sofia: Antarctic Place-names Commission of Bulgaria, 2005.
 L.L. Ivanov. Antarctica: Livingston Island and Greenwich, Robert, Snow and Smith Islands. Scale 1:120000 topographic map.  Troyan: Manfred Wörner Foundation, 2009.

References

External links
 SCAR Composite Antarctic Gazetteer.

Headlands of Greenwich Island